John Harry Godber  (born 18 May 1956) is known mainly for observational comedies. The Plays and Players Yearbook of 1993 rated him the third most performed playwright in the UK after William Shakespeare and Alan Ayckbourn. He has been creative director of the Theatre Royal Wakefield since 2011.

Biography
Godber, born in Upton, West Riding of Yorkshire, trained as a teacher of drama at Bretton Hall College, which is affiliated to the University of Leeds, and became artistic director of Hull Truck Theatre Company in 1984.

Before venturing into plays, he was head of drama at Minsthorpe High School, the school he had attended as a student, and then wrote for the TV series Brookside and Grange Hill. While he was at Minsthorpe he taught future actors Adrian Hood (Preston Front, Up 'n' Under film) and Chris Walker (Doctors, Coronation Street). A 1993 survey for Plays and Players magazine cited Godber as the third most performed playwright in the UK, after Shakespeare and Alan Ayckbourn. In 2005 he won two British Academy Children's Awards for Oddsquad, written and directed on location in Hull and screened by BBC children's television. His plays are performed across the world, Bouncers (1977) being the most popular.

In 2004 he became a visiting professor of Popular Theatre at Liverpool Hope University. He has also been professor of drama at Hull University. In 2011 John Godber became creative director at Theatre Royal Wakefield and set up the John Godber Company as its resident company.

Godber's earlier style utilises an interest in German Expressionism, an economic and physical style inspired by this and the inspiration of Bretton Hall Head of School (Drama) John Hodgson. His later and more naturalistic style reflects his growth as a member of the middle classes and an Ayckbournesque world of drama. He says that the "new Godber" is perhaps a writer like Tim Firth.

Godber is married to the writer and actress Jane Thornton, also known as Jane Clifford and Jane Godber.

The theatre facility at New College, Pontefract, a college near his birthplace, is named the John Godber Theatre. It opened in 2012.

Bibliography

A Clockwork Orange (1976, adaptation)
Bouncers (1977)
Toys of Age (1979)
Cramp (1982)
Cry Wolf (1981) first professional production
Guyonal Priority Area (1982)
Happy Jack (1982)
September in the Rain (1983)
Young Hearts Run Free (1983)
Bouncers (for Yorkshire actors) (1983)
Up 'n' Under (1984)
A Christmas Carol (1984) adaptation
Shakers (1985) co-written with Jane Thornton
Up 'n' Under II (1985)
Blood, Sweat and Tears (1986)
Cramp – the Musical (1986)
Teechers (1987)
Oliver Twist (1987) adaptation
Salt of the Earth (1988)
On the Piste (1990)
Everyday Heroes (1990)
Shakers Re-stirred (1991)
Bouncers – 1990s Remix (1991)
Happy Families (1991)
April in Paris (1992)
The Office Party (1992)
Passion Killers (1994)
Dracula (1995) adaptation
Lucky Sods (1995)Shakers the Musical (1996)Gym and Tonic (1996)Weekend Breaks (1997)It Started with a Kiss (1997)Hooray for Hollywood (1998)The Weed (1998)Perfect Pitch (1998)Ella Chapman (1998)Thick as a Brick (1999)Big Trouble in the Little Bedroom (1999)Seasons in the Sun (2000)On a Night Like This (2000)Our House (2001)Departures (2001)Moby Dick (2002) adaptationYoung Hearts (2002)Men of the World (2002)Reunion (2002)Going Dutch (2005)Unleashed (2006)The Crown Prince (2007)Next Best Thing (2007)Sold (2007)Our House (2008)Funny Turns (2009)20,000 Leagues Under the Sea (2010) adaptationThe Debt Collectors (2011)The Sculptor's Surprise (2011) schools tour, co-written with Jane ThorntonLost and Found (2012) co-written with Jane ThorntonLosing The Plot (2013)Muddy Cows (2013)A Kind of Loving (2013) adaptationShafted (2015)Scary Bikers (2018)This is Not Right (2019)

FilmographyGrange Hill (1978) TV seriesToys of Age (1979) TVBrookside (1982) TV seriesThe Rainbow Coloured Disco Dancer (1983) TVCrown Court (1983) TVThe Ritz (1987) TV seriesMy Kingdom for a Horse (1991) TV seriesChalkface (1991) TV seriesShakers (1993) TVBloomin' Marvellous (1997) TV seriesUp 'n' Under (1998)Bouncers! (2000) TVThunder Road (2001) TVPortas, Os (2005) TVMake that happy'' (1997) TV

References

External links
John Godber official website

Times Interview with Godber. Trade Secrets. 16 December 2006. Accessed 15 April 2010

Academics of Liverpool Hope University
Alumni of Bretton Hall College
Plays by John Godber
English dramatists and playwrights
English theatre directors
Laurence Olivier Award winners
Officers of the Order of the British Empire
People from Upton, West Yorkshire
1956 births
Living people
English male dramatists and playwrights